Dirk Spaniel (born 3 November 1971) is a German politician. Born in Marburg, Hesse, he represents Alternative for Germany (AfD). Dirk Spaniel has served as a member of the Bundestag from the state of Baden-Württemberg since 2017.

Life 
He became member of the Bundestag after the 2017 German federal election. He is a member of the Committee on Transport and Digital Infrastructure. In 2021 he got reelected.

At the AfD-convention 2021 in Dresden Spaniel called for Germany to leave the European Union ("Dexit").

References

External links 

  
 Bundestag biography 

1971 births
Living people
Members of the Bundestag for Baden-Württemberg
Members of the Bundestag 2021–2025
Members of the Bundestag 2017–2021
Members of the Bundestag for the Alternative for Germany